Tournaments include international (FIBA), professional (club) and amateur and collegiate levels.

Championships

International
2006 FIBA World Championship:
Gold medal:  Spain
Silver medal:  Greece
Bronze medal:  USA
MVP:   Pau Gasol, Spain
All-tournament team:
 Pau Gasol
 Carmelo Anthony (USA)
 Jorge Garbajosa (Spain)
 Manu Ginóbili (Argentina)
 Theodoros Papaloukas (Greece)
2006 FIBA World Championship for Women

Gold medal:  Australia
Silver medal:  Russia
Bronze medal:  USA
MVP:  Penny Taylor, Australia
Basketball at the 2006 Asian Games
Men's tournament:
Gold medal:  China
Silver medal:  Qatar
Bronze medal:  Iran
Women's tournament:
Gold medal:  China
Silver medal:  Chinese Taipei
Bronze medal:  Japan

Professional

Men
 NBA season and playoffs:
2006 NBA Finals: Miami Heat 4, Dallas Mavericks 2. MVP: Dwyane Wade
2006 NBA draft
2006 NBA All-Star Game
EuroLeague (Europe-wide):
CSKA Moscow defeated Maccabi Tel Aviv 73-69 in the final
 Croatian League:
Cibona defeated Zadar 2-1 in the best-of-three finals
 French League:
Le Mans defeated Nancy 93-88 in the one-off final
 German Bundesliga:
RheinEnergie Köln defeated Alba Berlin 3-1 in the best-of-five finals
 Greek League:
Panathinaikos defeated Olympiakos 3-0 in the best-of-five finals
 Iranian Super League, 2005–06 season:
Saba Battery defeat Petrochimi 3–0 in the best-of-five final.
 Israel Premier League:
Maccabi Tel Aviv defeated Hapoel Jerusalem 96-66 in the one-off final (the first such final in Israel history)
 Italian Serie A:
Benetton Treviso defeated Climamio Bologna 3-1 in the best-of-five finals
 Lithuanian LKL:
Lietuvos Rytas defeated Žalgiris 4-0 in the best-of-seven finals
 Philippine Basketball Association 2005–06 season:
Red Bull Barako over the Purefoods Chunkee Giants 4-2 in the Fiesta Conference Finals. Finals MVP: Lordy Tugade
Purefoods Chunkee Giants over Red Bull Barako 4-2 in the Philippine Cup Finals. Finals MVP: Marc Pingris
 Polish League:
Prokom Trefl Sopot over Anwil Włocławek 4-1 in the best-of-seven finals
 Russian Super League:
CSKA Moscow over Khimki 3-0 in the best-of-five finals
 Serbia and Montenegro Super League:
Partizan over Red Star 3-0 in the best-of-five finals
 Spanish ACB:
Unicaja Málaga over TAU Cerámica 3-0 in the best-of-five finals
2005–06 season, 2005–06 playoffs
 Turkish Basketball League:
Ülkerspor over Efes Pilsen 4-0 in the best-of-seven finals. Only three matches were actually played; under Turkish rules, Ülker was granted a 1-0 lead by virtue of its regular-season sweep of Efes.
 British Basketball League:
Newcastle Eagles defeated Scottish Rocks 83-68 in the one-off final
 Adriatic League:
FMP defeated Partizan 73-72 in the one-off final

Women
 2006 WNBA Finals: Detroit Shock 3, Sacramento Monarchs 2
2006 WNBA season
2006 WNBA Playoffs
2006 WNBA draft
2006 WNBA All-Star Game
MVP: Deanna Nolan, Detroit

College
Men
 NCAA
Division I: Florida 73, UCLA 57
National Invitation Tournament: South Carolina 76, Michigan 64
Division II: Winona State 73, Virginia Union 61
Division III: Virginia Wesleyan 59, Wittenberg 56
 NAIA
NAIA Division I: Texas Wesleyan 67, Oklahoma City 65
NAIA Division II: University of the Ozarks (Mo.) 74, Huntington (Ind.) 56
 NJCAA
Division I: Arkansas-Ft. Smith 68, Tallahassee CC (FL) 59
Division II:  Cecil CC 9 (MD) 64,  Kirkwood CC (IA) 63
Division III:   North Lake College (TX) 78,  Gloucester County College (N.J.) 65
 UAAP Men's: University of Santo Tomas over Ateneo de Manila University, 2 games to 1
 NCAA (Philippines) Seniors': San Beda College over Philippine Christian University, 2 games to 1

Women
 NCAA
Division I: Maryland 78, Duke 75 OT
WNIT: Kansas State 77, Marquette 65
Division II: Grand Valley State 58, American International 52
Division III Hope 69, Southern Maine 56
 NAIA
NAIA Division I: Union (TN) 79, Lubbock Christian (TX) 62
NAIA Division II Hastings (Neb.)58, University of the Ozarks (Mo.) 39
 NJCAA
Division I:   Monroe CC (Rochester, New York) 76, Odessa College (TX) 64
Division II:  Illinois Central College 71,  Kirkwood CC (IA) 54
Division III:   Monroe College (Bronx, New York) 100,  Mohawk Valley CC (NY) 70
 UAAP Women's: University of Santo Tomas over Far Eastern University, 2 games to 1

Prep
 USA Today Boys Basketball Ranking #1: Lawrence North High School, Indianapolis, Indiana
 USA Today Girls Basketball Ranking #1: Christ the King, Queens, New York
 NCAA (Philippines) Juniors: San Sebastian Recoletos High School over Philippine Christian University Union High School, 2 games to 0
 UAAP Juniors: Ateneo de Manila High School over Far Eastern University-Nicanor Reyes Educational Foundation, 2 games to 1

Awards and honors

Naismith Memorial Basketball Hall of Fame
Class of 2006:
 Geno Auriemma
 Charles Barkley
 Joe Dumars
 Alessandro "Sandro" Gamba
 Dave Gavitt
 Jacques Dominique Wilkins

Women's Basketball Hall of Fame
Class of 2006
 Geno Auriemma
 Maria Paula Gonçalves da Silva
 Clarissa Davis-Wrightsil
 Janice Lawrence Braxton
 Katrina McClain Johnson
 Barbara Stevens

Professional
Men
NBA Most Valuable Player Award: Steve Nash
NBA Rookie of the Year Award: Chris Paul
NBA Defensive Player of the Year Award: Ben Wallace
NBA Coach of the Year Award: Avery Johnson
FIBA Europe Player of the Year Award: Theodoros Papaloukas, CSKA Moscow and 
Euroscar Award: Dirk Nowitzki, Dallas Mavericks and 
Women
WNBA Most Valuable Player Award: Lisa Leslie, Los Angeles Sparks
WNBA Defensive Player of the Year Award: Tamika Catchings, Indiana Fever
WNBA Rookie of the Year Award: Seimone Augustus, Minnesota Lynx
WNBA Most Improved Player Award: Erin Buescher, Sacramento Monarchs
Kim Perrot Sportsmanship Award: Dawn Staley, Houston Comets
WNBA Coach of the Year Award: Mike Thibault, Connecticut Sun
WNBA Finals Most Valuable Player Award: Deanna Nolan, Detroit Shock
FIBA Europe Player of the Year Award: Maria Stepanova,  CSKA Samara and

Collegiate 
 Combined
Legends of Coaching Award: Jim Boeheim, Syracuse
 Men
John R. Wooden Award: J. J. Redick, Duke
Naismith College Coach of the Year: Jay Wright, Villanova
Frances Pomeroy Naismith Award: Dee Brown, Illinois
Associated Press College Basketball Player of the Year: J. J. Redick, Duke
NCAA basketball tournament Most Outstanding Player: Corey Brewer, Florida
USBWA National Freshman of the Year: Tyler Hansbrough, North Carolina
Associated Press College Basketball Coach of the Year: Roy Williams (coach), North Carolina
Naismith Outstanding Contribution to Basketball: Jerry Colangelo
 Women
John R. Wooden Award: Seimone Augustus, LSU
Naismith College Player of the Year: Seimone Augustus, LSU
Naismith College Coach of the Year: Sylvia Hatchell, North Carolina
Wade Trophy: Seimone Augustus, LSU
Frances Pomeroy Naismith Award: Megan Duffy, Notre Dame
Associated Press Women's College Basketball Player of the Year: Seimone Augustus, LSU
NCAA basketball tournament Most Outstanding Player: Laura Harper, Maryland
Basketball Academic All-America Team: Lindsay Shearer, Kent State
Carol Eckman Award: Gail Goestenkors, Duke
USBWA National Freshman of the Year: Courtney Paris, Oklahoma
Associated Press College Basketball Coach of the Year: Sylvia Hatchell, North Carolina
List of Senior CLASS Award women's basketball winners: Seimone Augustus, LSU
Nancy Lieberman Award: Ivory Latta, North Carolina
Naismith Outstanding Contribution to Basketball: Val Ackerman

Events
December 13- after a few months in use and complaints from players, the NBA announces it will disuse the new synthetic ball in favor of the classic leather one.
December 16- a brawl erupted at the Madison Square Garden game between the New York Knicks and the Denver Nuggets.

Movies
Church Ball
Crossover (film)
The Heart of the Game
Glory Road (film)
Like Mike 2: Streetball

Deaths
 February 11 — Harry Vines, American wheelchair basketball coach (born 1938)
 March 17 — Ray Meyer, American Hall of Fame coach of the DePaul University men's team (born 1913)
 April 6 — Maggie Dixon, women's coach at Army (born 1977)
 April 6 — Price Brookfield, American NBA player (born 1920)
 April 19 — Gene Rosenthal, American NBL player (Pittsburgh Pirates) (born 1914)
 May 6 — Bob Dro, national champion at Indiana and Indianapolis Kautskys player (born 1918)
 May 9 — Grady Wallace, All-American and national scoring champion at South Carolina
 May 18 — Irving Meretsky, Canadian Olympic silver medalist (1936) (born 1912)
 July 3 — Dick Dickey, NBA player and All-American at NC State (born 1926)
 July 4 — Bobby Joe Mason, Harlem Globetrotters player and college All-American at Bradley (born 1936)
 July 21 — Alexander Petrenko, Russian player (BC Khimki) (born 1976)
 August 18 — Dick Hickox, American college All-American (Miami Hurricanes) (born 1938)
 September 7 — Ozell Jones, American NBA player (San Antonio Spurs, Los Angeles Clippers) (born 1960)
 October 5 — Cleveland Buckner, American NBA player (New York Knicks) (born 1938)
 October 5 — George King, American NBA player (Syracuse Nationals, Cincinnati Royals) and college coach (West Virginia, Purdue) (born 1928)
 October 25 — Johnny Hoekstra, American NBL player (Kankakee Gallagher Trojans) (born 1917)
 October 28 — Arnold "Red" Auerbach, Hall of Fame coach and president of the Boston Celtics (born 1917)
 November 9 — Mikhail Semyonov, Russian (Soviet) Olympic Silver medalist (1956, 1960) (born 1933)
 November 29 — Gary Alcorn, American NBA player (Detroit Pistons, Los Angeles Lakers) (born 1936)
 December 12 — Paul Arizin, Hall of Famer for the Philadelphia Warriors who twice led the NBA in scoring (born 1928)
 December 13 — Lamar Hunt, original ownership partner of the Chicago Bulls (born 1932)
 December 21 — Warren Hair, American NBL player (Kankakee Gallagher Trojans) (born 1918)
 December 29 — Charlie Tyra, All-American college (Louisville) and NBA player (New York Knicks, Chicago Packers) (born 1935)

See also
 Timeline of women's basketball

References

External links